Okia is a genus of flowering plants belonging to the family Asteraceae.

Its native range is Indo-China.

Species:

Okia birmanica 
Okia pseudobirmanica

References

Asteraceae
Asteraceae genera